Acronychia aberrans, commonly known as acid berry, lemon aspen, plasticine tree or plasticene aspen, is a species of medium-sized rainforest tree that is endemic to north-eastern Queensland. It has simple leaves on stems that are more or less square in cross-section, flowers in small groups in leaf axils and fleshy, more or less spherical fruit.

Description
Its leafy stems are more or less square in cross-section, giving the appearance of having been squeezed like plasticine.

Taxonomy
Acronychia aberrans was first formally described in 1974 by Thomas Gordon Hartley in the Journal of the Arnold Arboretum from specimens collected by Bernard Hyland on the Atherton Tableland. The specific epithet is a reference to the unusual shape of the branchlets.

Distribution and habitat

Conservation status
Acid berry is classified as of "least concern" under the Queensland Government Nature Conservation Act 1992.

References

aberrans
Flora of Queensland
Plants described in 1974
Taxa named by Thomas Gordon Hartley